Wang Shi-ting was the defending champion and successfully defended her title, by defeating Kyōko Nagatsuka 6–1, 6–3 in the final.

Seeds

Draw

Finals

Top half

Bottom half

References

External links
 Official results archive (ITF)

Taipei Women's Championship
Taipei Women's Championship
Taipei Women's Championship, 1994